Rodrigue Moundounga (born 28 August 1982) is a Gabonese international footballer who plays as a defender for CF Mounana.

Career
Born in Libreville, Moundounga played in his native Gabon for USM Libreville, Delta Téléstar, FC 105 Libreville and AS Mangasport, before moving to Tunisian side Olympique Béja in 2010.

Moundounga has made several appearances for the Gabon national football team. He played for the side the finished third at the 2005 CEMAC Cup.

References

External links

1982 births
Living people
Gabonese footballers
Gabon international footballers
2012 Africa Cup of Nations players
Olympique Béja players
Gabonese expatriate footballers
Expatriate footballers in Tunisia
Gabonese expatriate sportspeople in Tunisia
Association football fullbacks
21st-century Gabonese people
Gabon A' international footballers
2016 African Nations Championship players